Leucanopsis strigulosa is a moth of the family Erebidae. It was described by Francis Walker in 1855. It is found in Pará, Brazil.

References

 

strigulosa
Moths described in 1855